The Oil Gush Fire in Bibiheybat is an 1898 Azerbaijani silent film. Directed by the pioneer of cinema in Azerbaijan, Alexandre Michon, this 30-second film was shot on August 6, 1898 in Bibiheybət village near Baku and presented at the International Paris Exhibition.

The film was shot using a 35mm film on a Lumière cinematograph. Some scenes from this film were also shown in France in 1995, in a footage commemorating the 100th anniversary of world cinema.

See also
List of Azerbaijani films: 1898-1919

References

Azerbaijani silent short films
1898 films
Azerbaijani black-and-white films
Oil wells
Films of the Russian Empire
1898 short films
Films shot in Azerbaijan